Peniel College was a Nazarene college located in Peniel, Texas. It has since closed.

History
Texas Holiness University was founded by B. A. Cordell and E. C. DeJernett in 1898. It was then established on a 37-acre campus in 1899 by A. M. Hills and a small holiness community at Holiness, later called Peniel and now part of Greenville, Texas. It was sponsored by the Holiness Association of Texas, but the association disbanded in 1910 after many of its members united with the Church of the Nazarene. The school then became one of the first three "official" Nazarene educational institutions in 1908, supported by the Dallas District Church of the Nazarene, and the name was changed to Peniel College. In 1920, the college merged with Oklahoma Nazarene College in Bethany, Oklahoma, which was then renamed "Bethany-Peniel College".

Peniel's presidents included A. M. Hills, Edgar Ellyson (1907-1911), Roy T. Williams (1911-1913), J. B. Chapman (1913-1918), and A. K. Bracken, who took the presidency at Bethany-Peniel College in 1920.

Legacy
Founded in 1909, Oklahoma Holiness College, called Oklahoma Nazarene College when it absorbed Peniel College, took on the founding date of Texas Holiness University (1899).

Notes and references

 
Educational institutions established in 1899
1920 disestablishments in Texas
Buildings and structures in Hunt County, Texas
Defunct private universities and colleges in Texas
Defunct Nazarene universities and colleges
1899 establishments in Texas